Clifton Carlyle Cottrell (February 19, 1895 - February 1, 1980) served in the California State Assembly for the 31st district from 1933 to 1939. During World War I he served in the United States Army.

References

United States Army personnel of World War I
Republican Party members of the California State Assembly
1895 births
1980 deaths